Buffalo County is the name of three counties in the United States:

 Buffalo County, Nebraska 
 Buffalo County, South Dakota 
 Buffalo County, Wisconsin
 Buffalo County, an extinct county in Kansas; see List of counties in Kansas